HSBC Bank USA, National Association, an American subsidiary of multinational company HSBC, is a bank with its operational head office in New York City and its nominal head office in McLean, Virginia (as designated on its charter). HSBC Bank USA, N.A. is a national bank chartered under the National Bank Act, and thus is regulated by the Office of the Comptroller of the Currency (OCC), a part of the U.S. Department of the Treasury. The company has 159 branch locations.

History
In 1980, The Hongkong and Shanghai Banking Corporation acquired a 51% controlling interest in Marine Midland Bank, headquartered in Buffalo, New York. HSBC acquired the remaining interest in 1987. The banks continued to operate under the Marine Midland name until 1998, when the offices were re-branded as HSBC Bank.

In 1994, Marine Midland acquired Spectrum Home Mortgage, which operated in eight states. In 1995, Marine Midland acquired United Northern Federal Savings Bank, with branches in Watertown and Lowville, New York. Marine Midland also acquired The HSBC's 6 New York City retail branches, and the next year Hang Seng Bank's two branches in New York City.

That same year, Marine Midland acquired 11 branches from the East River Savings Bank in the New York Metropolitan area. Marine also acquired the US dollar clearing business of JPMorgan Chase. At the same time, HSBC transferred 2 branches in the northwestern United States to HSBC Bank Canada. The next year, Marine completed its acquisition of First Federal Savings and Loan from Toronto-based Canada Trust, for $620 million. First Federal Savings, headquartered in Rochester, had $7.2 billion in assets, 1,600 employees, 79 retail branches in New York State and 15 mortgage origination offices in 9 states.

In 1998, Marine Midland acquired First Commercial Bank of Philadelphia, which had $90 million in assets and $78 million in deposits in two branches and focused on the Asian-American community, for $23.75 million.

In 1999, the company acquired Republic New York for $10.3 billion and moved its head office from One HSBC Center in Buffalo to what is now the HSBC Tower on Fifth Avenue.

In 2004, HSBC USA sold two upstate New York branches to Gloversville-based City National Bank & Trust Co. HSBC did not have enough nearby branches to give it economies of scale.

In July 2011, the company sold its branches in upstate New York to First Niagara Financial Group for $1 billion, effectively selling-off the core of the old Marine Midland Bank.

In 2015, the company paid $30 million to settle a lawsuit regarding overdraft fees.

In 2016, the Office of the Comptroller of the Currency imposed a $35 million fine on the company for deceptive billing practices.

In 2019, HSBC announced plans to open new branches, including one in Depew, New York, near one of its remaining back offices in Buffalo. This came as a surprise after HSBC sold its branch network in Upstate New York in 2012 to First Niagara, KeyBank, Community Bank, N.A. and Five Star Bank.

In January 2019, HSBC announced it would open two new branches in Western New York, as part of the bank’s initiative to open 50 branches in new and existing markets in the United States. In February 2020, Reuters News Agency reported that HSBC Holdings would shed $100 billion in assets, shrink its investment bank and revamp its U.S. and European businesses, including closing around a third of its 224 branches and target only international and wealthier clients.

In February 2021 it was reported that HSBC is planning to pull out of all retail banking in the United States and that it is exploring a sale of its remaining 150 branches.  These reports proved true; on May 26, 2021, HSBC announced that it would abandon the United States retail market as part of a pivot to Asia.  Eighty HSBC branches on the East Coast are expected to be sold to Citizens Bank, as are HSBC's online operations.  HSBC's 10 West Coast branches are expected to be sold to Cathay Bank.  35-40 branches are expected to be closed entirely rather than be sold to another bank.  HSBC also announced it would maintain around two dozen locations within the United States, converting the branches from standard retail banks to "international wealth centers" for the use of international travelers who use HSBC, corporations, and certain high net-worth clients.

Money laundering and organized crime 
In December 2012, HSBC paid a record $1.9 billion fine for laundering in excess of $881,000,000 in drug cartel money and violating anti-terrorism sanctions. The cartels that HSBC helped included the Sinaloa cartel.

In September 2020, the FinCEN Files probe revealed that HSBC moved vast sums of dirty money for international criminals. HSBC did so even though compliance officers raised warnings about the sources of nearly $1.5 billion that was processed through the bank. Investigative reporting revealed that at least $900 million came from shell companies linked to alleged criminal networks. HSBC did these actions even though it was under probation by the U.S. for its past role in money laundering on behalf of criminal syndicates.

The FinCEN files also revealed that HSBC moved suspect money from Russia.

Operations
HSBC Bank works with OneSpan to issue multi-factor authentication tokens for online banking services.

Controversies
In 2010, HSBC was rated the worst in customer advocacy by Forrester Research, which asked bank customers to rank their banks. In the national survey of approximately 4,500 banking customers assessing the top 50 banks, in answer to the question: "My financial provider does what’s best for me, not just its own bottom line," HSBC set a new all-time low with a 16% rating, 10% below the previous year.  In 2012, the U.S. government uncovered a "blatant failure to implement proper anti-money laundering controls facilitat[ing] the laundering of at least $881 million in drug proceeds through the U.S. financial system".

References

External links

 HSBC Bank USA website
 Dennis, Brady (July 16, 2012). "Senate report criticizes HSBC for inadequate internal controls". The Washington Post.
 

Banks based in New York City
Banks established in 1850
United States of America
1850 establishments in the United States
American subsidiaries of foreign companies